The Toronto Rock are a lacrosse team based in Toronto playing in the National Lacrosse League (NLL). The 2006 season was the 9th in franchise history, and 8th as the Rock (they played one season as the Ontario Raiders). The Rock won the Championship in the 2005 season, but followed it up with a mediocre 8-8 record and an early exit from the playoffs at the hands of the Rochester Knighthawks.

Regular season

Conference standings

Game log
Reference:

Playoffs

Game log
Reference:

Player stats
Reference:

Runners (Top 10)

Note: GP = Games played; G = Goals; A = Assists; Pts = Points; LB = Loose Balls; PIM = Penalty minutes

Goaltenders
Note: GP = Games played; MIN = Minutes; W = Wins; L = Losses; GA = Goals against; Sv% = Save percentage; GAA = Goals against average

Awards

Transactions

Trades

Roster
Reference:

See also
2006 NLL season

References

External links

Toronto
2006 in Toronto